Oscar Edwin Smith Jr. was a former fullback in the National Football League. He was drafted by the Green Bay Packers in the third round of the 1948 NFL Draft and played that season with the team before splitting the following season between the Packers and the New York Bulldogs.

References

1923 births
2010 deaths
Players of American football from Virginia
American football halfbacks
UTEP Miners football players
Green Bay Packers players
New York Bulldogs players